"All Night" is a song by British recording artist Example featuring uncredited vocals by his wife Erin McNaught. It was released as a single on 11 January 2019. The song was written and produced by Example himself.

Background
After the birth of his second son in September 2017, starting up his own music label Staneric Recordings and releasing his 9-track mixtape "Bangers & Ballads" in August 2018, Gleave was motivated to record new music. He stated on his Instagram and Twitter accounts that he would be releasing a new song every month of 2019, starting with "All Night" in January 2019. Musically, the song is similar in sound to one of his previous singles "Later". The song marked Example's first appearance on the UK Singles Chart since his 2015 single "Whisky Story", peaking at #87. Upon the single's release, Spotify included it in multiple dance playlists.

Music video
The music video, directed by Example and his wife themselves, was premiered on YouTube a few hours before the single's release, on 10 January 2019. It has since reached over 38 million views. The video features both Example and his wife Erin dancing to the song in a dimly lit room at night while Example sings the song's lyrics. He has stated in multiple interviews that the video was shot while both of their sons were asleep.

Track listing

Charts

Release history

References

2019 songs
2019 singles
Example (musician) songs
Songs written by Example (musician)